Sergey Alekseyevich Lipinets (born 23 March 1989) is a Russian professional boxer and former kickboxer who held the IBF light-welterweight title from 2017 to 2018.

Early life and kickboxing career
Lipinets was born in Martuk, Kazakhstan, but moved to Russia at the age of 9. Lipinets originally competed as a kickboxer, medaling in competitions like the 2012 W.A.K.O. European Championships and the 2013 World Combat Games.

Professional boxing career
After a brief amateur boxing career in which he went 35–5, Lipinets turned pro in 2014.

Lipinets vs. Zappavigna 
After winning 10 pro bouts, Lipinets faced Lenny Zappavigna in an IBF eliminator. The winner would become the mandatory challenger to the IBF champion, the winner of an April 2017 bout between Ricky Burns and Julius Indongo. Lipinets proved to be too much for Zappavigna, as the latter went down during round 5 before being counted out following a right straight from Lipinets in round 8. Both fighters suffered several cuts during the fight. 

Following Indongo's win over Burns, Lipinets tried to start negotiations with the IBF champion. However, the IBF granted Indongo an exception to allow him to unify all the major light welterweight titles against Terence Crawford. After Crawford's win over Indongo, the IBF ordered Crawford to defend his title against Lipinets. Lipinets stated that the IBF title was "stolen from him". As Crawford didn't plan to return to the ring before the IBF's deadline, he vacated the IBF title just 11 days after defeating Indongo.

Lipinets vs. Kondo 
The IBF ordered Lipinets to face Akihiro Kondo for their vacant title. The fight was finalized for 4 November on the undercard of a Deontay Wilder bout. The event was televised on Showtime. Lipinets became the IBF champion, winning by unanimous decision (118–110, 117–111, 117–111). The decision was booed upon being announced but several media outlets scored it for Lipinets, albeit on closer cards. Lipinets connected to Kondo's body often throughout the fight, but Kondo remained unfazed by the body shots. Kondo kept coming forward and rocked Lipinets in round 5. Lipinets was cut by an accidental head clash midway through the fight.

Lipinets vs. Clayton 
On 24 October, 2020, Lipinets faced Custio Clayton who was ranked #4 by the WBO, #5 by the IBF and #10 by the WBA. The bout ended in a majority draw, with two of the judges scoring the fight 114-114, 114-114, while the third judge saw Clayton as the winner scoring it 115-113 in his favor.

Lipinets vs. Ennis 
In his next bout, Lipinets fought Jaron Ennis, ranked #7 by the WBO, #9 by the IBF and #12 by the WBC at welterweight. Despite catching Ennis a few times, Lipinets was mostly overmatched in the bout and lost the fight via sixth round KO.

Titles and accomplishments

Kickboxing
Professional
 WAKO-Pro Full Contact World -64.5kg Champion

Amateur
World Association of Kickboxing Organizations
 2011 WAKO World Championships in Dublin Full Contact -63.5kg 
 2012 WAKO European Championships in Bucharest Full Contact -63.5kg 
 2012 WAKO World Cup Bestfighter in Rimini Full Contact -63.5kg 
 2013 WAKO World Championships in Antalya Full Contact -63.5kg 

World Combat Games
 2013 World Combat Games Full Contact -63.5kg

Professional boxing record

Kickboxing record

|-  style="background:#cfc;"
| 2012-10-20|| Win||align=left| Rasul Kachakaev || Grand Prix Russia Open || Moscow, Russia|| KO (Left Hook) || 1 || 

|-  style="background:#cfc;"
| 2012-08-|| Win||align=left| Maxim Kolpak||  ||  Russia|| Decision || 3 || 3:00  

|-  style="background:#cfc;"
| 2012-03-03|| Win||align=left| Mickael Lacombe || Full Contact International Gala || Montceau-les-Mines, France|| KO  || 4 || 
|-
! style=background:white colspan=9 |

|-  style="background:#cfc;"
| 2011-12-21|| Win||align=left| Sergey Popa ||  || Moscow, Russia|| TKO || 1 ||  

|-  style="background:#cfc;"
| 2011-05-28|| Win||align=left| Vitaly Lisnyak || Grand Prix Russia Open || Moscow, Russia|| Decision || 3 ||3:00 

|-  style="background:#cfc;"
| 2010-11-27|| Win||align=left| Alexey Radik ||  || Moscow, Russia|| Decision (Unanimous) || 5 || 3:00 

|-  style="background:#fbb;"
| 2009-05-21|| Loss||align=left| Serhiy Adamchuk || BARS: Russia vs Ukraine || Russia, Moscow|| KO  || 2 || 
|-
| colspan=9 | Legend:    

|-  style="background:#cfc;"
| 2013-12-08|| Win ||align=left| Elnur Daryagir || 2013 WAKO World Championships, Final || Antalya, Turkey|| Decision || 3 || 2:00
|-
! style=background:white colspan=9 |

|-  style="background:#cfc;"
| 2013-12-07|| Win ||align=left| Aibek Duishembiev || 2013 WAKO World Championships, Semi Final || Antalya, Turkey|| Decision || 3 || 2:00

|-  style="background:#cfc;"
| 2013-12-05|| Win ||align=left| Milton Galarreta || 2013 WAKO World Championships, Quarter Final || Antalya, Turkey|| TKO || 2 || 

|-  style="background:#cfc;"
| 2013-12-04|| Win ||align=left| Andoni Iglesias	 || 2013 WAKO World Championships, 1/8 Final || Antalya, Turkey|| Decision || 3 || 2:00

|-  style="background:#fbb;"
| 2013-10-25|| Loss||align=left| Gabor Gorbics || 2013 World Combat Games, Final || Saint Petersburg, Russia|| Decision (Unanimous)  || 3 || 2:00
|-
! style=background:white colspan=9 |

|-  style="background:#cfc;"
| 2013-10-23|| Win ||align=left| William Saidi || 2013 World Combat Games, Semi Final || Saint Petersburg, Russia|| Decision (Unanimous)  || 3 || 2:00

|-  style="background:#cfc;"
| 2013-10-21|| Win ||align=left| Konstyantyn Demoretsky || 2013 World Combat Games, Quarter Final || Saint Petersburg, Russia|| Decision (Unanimous)  || 3 || 2:00

|-  style="background:#cfc;"
| 2012-12-01|| Win ||align=left| Gabor Garbics || 2012 WAKO European Championships, Final || Bucharest, Romania|| Decision (Unanimous)  || 3 || 2:00
|-
! style=background:white colspan=9 |

|-  style="background:#cfc;"
| 2012-11-30|| Win ||align=left| || 2012 WAKO European Championships, Semi Final || Bucharest, Romania|| Decision (Unanimous)  || 3 || 2:00

|-  style="background:#fbb;"
| 2011-11-|| Loss||align=left| Konstyantyn Demoretsky || 2011 WAKO World Championships, Final || Dublin, Ireland|| Decision (Majority)  || 3 || 2:00
|-
! style=background:white colspan=9 |

|-  style="background:#cfc;"
| 2011-11-|| Win ||align=left| || 2011 WAKO World Championships, Semi Final || Dublin, Ireland|| Decision (Majority)  || 3 || 2:00
|-
| colspan=9 | Legend:

See also
List of light-welterweight boxing champions

References

External links

Sergey Lipinets - Profile, News Archive & Current Rankings at Box.Live

1989 births
Living people
Light-welterweight boxers
Welterweight boxers
World light-welterweight boxing champions
International Boxing Federation champions
Kazakhstani people of Russian descent
People from Aktobe
Russian male boxers
Russian male kickboxers